The Wassmer WA-30 Bijave is a French two-seat advanced training glider designed and built by Wassmer Aviation of Issoire.

Design and development
The WA-30 Bijave is two-seat development of the Wassmer WA-21 Javelot II and the first Bijave flew on 17 December 1958 from Issoire Aerodrome. The Bijave is a cantilever shoulder-wing monoplane with a welded steel tube fuselage covered with fabric and reinforced plastic. The wing is made from wood, covered in birch forward of the spar and fabric to the rear, it has no flaps but is fitted with retractable perforated wooden airbrakes. The pilot and passenger sit in tandem in an enclosed cockpit with individual transparent canopies. The landing gear is a fixed monowheel, a wooden rubber-sprung skid under the nose and a steel tailskid.

Specifications

See also

References

Notes

Bibliography

1950s French sailplanes
WA-30
Glider aircraft
Aircraft first flown in 1958
Shoulder-wing aircraft